Gerhard Topp (16 April 1893 – 16 January 1968) was a Danish athlete. He competed in the men's individual cross country event at the 1912 Summer Olympics.

References

1893 births
1968 deaths
Athletes (track and field) at the 1912 Summer Olympics
Danish male long-distance runners
Olympic athletes of Denmark
Athletes from Copenhagen
Olympic cross country runners